The Culture of Connectivity: A Critical History of Social Media is a book by José van Dijck published by Oxford University Press in 2013 on social media platforms and their history. The author considers the histories of five social media platforms: Facebook, Twitter, Flickr, YouTube, and Wikipedia. She focuses on how their technological, social and cultural dimensions contribute to their current status.

References

2013 non-fiction books
Media studies
University of Amsterdam
Works about the information economy
Digital media
Social media
Oxford University Press books
Books about Wikipedia